Mannava is a surname for some families in Andhra Pradesh, southern India. It is an Indian family name and also the name of a small place Guntur. Historically, surnames evolved as a way to sort people into groups - by occupation, place of origin, clan affiliation, patronage, parentage, adoption, and even physical characteristics (like red hair). 

Notable people with Mannava as a surname include:
Mannava Balayya, Tollywood actor
Mannava Srikanth Prasad, Indian cricket player

Indian surnames